Blanca Morales-Satre (born 3 February 1970) is a former Guatemalan swimmer who competed in the 1984 Summer Olympics, 1988 Summer Olympics, and 1992 Summer Olympics.

References

1970 births
Living people
Guatemalan female swimmers
Guatemalan female freestyle swimmers
Female butterfly swimmers
Female medley swimmers
Olympic swimmers of Guatemala
Swimmers at the 1984 Summer Olympics
Swimmers at the 1988 Summer Olympics
Swimmers at the 1992 Summer Olympics
Central American and Caribbean Games gold medalists for Guatemala
Central American and Caribbean Games medalists in swimming
Competitors at the 1986 Central American and Caribbean Games